Lieutenant-Colonel Archibald Ogilvie Lyttelton Kindersley,  (7 April 1869 – 19 June 1955) was a British soldier and diplomat.

Biography 

Entering the British Army, Kindersley was promoted to captain on 17 September 1892, and served with the Highland Light Infantry in Niger Coast Protectorate from 1893 to 1896, including the Brass River Expedition of 1895. He was re-commissioned for active service during the Second Boer War, and left Southampton in February 1900 with a battalion of the Scottish Rifles headed for South Africa, where he served as a transport officer. He received the honorary rank of major on 12 April 1902.

Following the end of the war, Kindersley worked as a colonial administrator in South Africa. He was Honorary attaché to the British Embassy in Tokyo from 1911 to 1913.  He was recalled to military service in 1914 for World War I, in Salonika Campaign from 1916 to 1919, where he was three times mentioned in dispatches, and awarded the Ordre de l’Etoile noire.  He commanded the 1st Garr. Batt. of the Seaforth Highlanders and the 11th (Service) Batt. Cameronians.  He was appointed CMG in 1919.

Kindersley was a Deputy Lieutenant of Hampshire and County President of the Isle of Wight Boy Scouts Association.  He resided at Hamstead Grange, near Yarmouth, Isle of Wight.

Family
In 1908 Kindersley married Edith daughter of Thomas Craven, JP, of Kirklington Hall, Notts, sometime High Sheriff of Nottinghamshire.  They had two sons and a daughter; Claude Richard Henry Kindersley (1911-1993), and Alistair Thomas James Kindersley (died 1941 on active service aged 26).  His first wife died in 1936.  In 1937 he remarried to the Hon. Emily Seely, eldest daughter of J. E. B. Seely, 1st Baron Mottistone.

References 

1869 births
1955 deaths
British Army personnel of the Second Boer War
British Army personnel of World War I
Companions of the Order of St Michael and St George
Deputy Lieutenants of Hampshire
Highland Light Infantry officers